USS Penn may refer to more than one United States Navy ship:

, also referred to as USS Penn R. R. No. 9, a tug and minesweeper in commission from 1917 to 1919
, an attack transport commissioned in 1942 and sunk in 1943

United States Navy ship names